Raspberry ketone is a natural phenolic compound that is the primary aroma compound of red raspberries.

Occurrence
Raspberry ketone occurs in a variety of fruits, including raspberries, cranberries, and blackberries. It is detected and released by orchid flowers, e.g. Dendrobium superbum (syn D. annosmum), and several Bulbophyllum species    to attract raspberry ketone-responsive male Dacini fruit flies. It is biosynthesized from coumaroyl-CoA. It can be extracted from the fruit, yielding about 1–4 mg per kg of raspberries.

Preparation
Since the natural abundance of raspberry ketone is very low, it is prepared industrially by a variety of methods from chemical intermediates. One of the ways this can be done is through a Claisen-Schmidt condensation followed by catalytic hydrogenation. First, acetone is condensed with 4-hydroxybenzaldehyde to form an α,β-unsaturated ketone. Then the alkene part is reduced to the alkane. This two-step method produces raspberry ketone in 99% yield. There is a less expensive hydrogenation catalyst, nickel boride, which also demonstrates high selectivity towards hydrogenation of the double bond of enone.

Uses
Raspberry ketone is sometimes used in perfumery, in cosmetics, and as a food additive to impart a fruity odor. It is one of the most expensive natural flavor components used in the food industry. The natural compound can cost as much as $20,000 per kg. Synthetic raspberry ketone is cheaper, with estimates ranging from a couple of dollars per pound to one fifth of the cost of the natural product.

Marketing
Although products containing this compound are marketed for weight loss, there is no clinical evidence for this effect in humans. They are called "ketones", because of the ketone (acetone) group at their end, which is shared with ketone bodies.

Safety
Little is known about the long-term safety of raspberry ketone supplements, especially since little research has been done with humans.  Toxicological models indicate a potential for cardiotoxic effects, as well as effects on reproduction and development. Furthermore, in many dietary supplements containing raspberry ketones, manufacturers add other ingredients such as caffeine which may have unsafe effects.

In 1965, the US Food and Drug Administration classified raspberry ketone as generally recognized as safe (GRAS) for the small quantities used to flavor foods.

See also
Raspberry ellagitannin

References 

Flavors
Food additives
Ketones
Perfume ingredients
Ketone